Bay Port High School is a public high school in the Howard-Suamico School District in Wisconsin.  Its enrollment for the 2006-2007 school year was approximately 1,675.

The school colors are navy blue, Columbia blue and white. Bay Port's mascot is a pirate, with an eye patch over one eye, and a sword clenched in his teeth. He also wears a pirate hat with a skull and crossbones.

History
Founded in 1963, Bay Port High School had a graduating class of 30 in 1964. In 2000, Bay Port moved from its original location in Howard, Wisconsin to its new home in Suamico, Wisconsin.

Demographics
BPHS is 90 percent white, three percent Hispanic, three percent black, two percent Asian, and one percent Native American.

Academics
Bay Port offers Advanced Placement courses and the International Baccalaureate curriculum, as well as an iAcademy offering online courses. The school houses film labs, art studios, and a greenhouse, an athletic field, and performing arts wings. Graduation is held in early June with a ceremony in the fieldhouse.

Extracurricular activities 
Bay Port's student newspaper is The Portside and its yearbook is The Anchor. Both are published by students with the advising of teachers and staff.

Bay Port has several school traditions, including the annual Homecoming week with daily class competitions. The school also sponsors several formal dances for students such as Homecoming, the Snow Ball, Junior Prom, and Senior Ball.

Performing arts
BPHS previously had a competitive swing choir.

Athletics 
The campus grounds include a track, football field, several soccer fields, baseball diamonds, batting cages, practice fields, a fieldhouse, weight room, and training facilities. Competing in the Fox River Classic Conference, Bay Port has boys' and girls' teams for football, dance team, cheerleading, cross-country, soccer, swimming, tennis, basketball, wrestling, baseball, bowling, golf, hockey, lacrosse, softball, and track and field.

Academic teams 
Bay Port hosts academic teams in mathematics, literature, and science. The school participates in Academic Decathlon. The Bay Port Academic Decathlon team won the regional competition in 2017.

Notable alumni
 Dan Buenning, former football player
 Jay DeMerit, former team captain of Watford F.C. in England, former defender on the United States men's national soccer team, and team captain of Vancouver Whitecaps.
 Alec Ingold, NFL football player
 Cole Van Lanen, NFL football player

References

External links
 Official school website

High schools in Green Bay, Wisconsin
Educational institutions established in 1962
Public high schools in Wisconsin
1962 establishments in Wisconsin